The Parade Park Maintenance Building in Kansas City, Missouri is a building from 1912. It was listed on the National Register of Historic Places in 2008.

References

Infrastructure completed in 1912
Buildings and structures in Kansas City, Missouri
Government buildings on the National Register of Historic Places in Missouri
1912 establishments in Missouri
National Register of Historic Places in Kansas City, Missouri